Albert Bimper (born July 26, 1983) is a Senior Associate Athletic Director for Diversity and Inclusion and Assistant Professor of Ethnic Studies at Colorado State University in Fort Collins, Colorado.

Biography
Bimper previously served as  Assistant Professor of Student Affairs at Kansas State University in Manhattan, Kansas.  He completed his Ph.D studies at The University of Texas at Austin.  Bimper is a former American football center for the Indianapolis Colts of the National Football League and holds a B.S. from Colorado State University and a M.S. from Purdue University.

Bimper played college football for the Colorado State Rams as a center.  He earned three varsity letters at Colorado State and Mountain West Conference honorable mention.  He missed four games his senior year due to injuries.

References

External links
 Faculty Bio Kansas State University

1983 births
Living people
Players of American football from Dallas
American football centers
Colorado State Rams football players
Indianapolis Colts players